The women's tournament in ice hockey at the 2010 Winter Olympics was held in Vancouver, British Columbia, Canada from February 13 to 25. Eight teams competed, seeded into two groups. Canada won the final by a score of 2–0 over the United States, who were awarded silver. The bronze medal game was won by Finland with a 3–2 victory over Sweden in overtime.

The tournament consisted of 20 games: 12 in the preliminary round (teams play the other teams in their own group); 4 final classification games; 2 semifinal games; 1 bronze medal game; and 1 final.

The tournament had a total attendance of 162,419, an average of 8,120 spectators per game, making it the most attended IIHF-run women's hockey tournament of all-time.

Qualification

Rosters

Group A
 (roster)
 (roster)
 (roster)
 (roster)

Group B
 (roster)
 (roster)
 (roster)
 (roster)

First round

Group A

All times are local (UTC−8).

Group B

All times are local (UTC−8).

Classification round

Fifth place semifinal
All times are local (UTC−8).

Seventh place game
All times are local (UTC−8).

Fifth place game
All times are local (UTC−8).

Final round

Semifinals
All times are local (UTC−8).

Bronze medal game
All times are local (UTC−8).

Final
All times are local (UTC−8).

Final rankings
The final rankings of the 2010 Winter Olympics Women's Ice Hockey Tournament are as follows:

Statistics

Leading scorers

Hat-trick scorers
 (2)

 (2)

 (2)

Leading goaltenders

Goalies with 40% or more of their team's total minutes

Shutout posters

 
  (2)
 
 
  (2)

Awards
Canada's Meghan Agosta was named the most valuable player and received the Directorate Award for best forward of the tournament.  Directorate Awards also went to Molly Engstrom (United States) for best defenceman, and to Shannon Szabados (Canada) for best goaltender.

The tournament all-star team was voted on by the international media at the conclusion of the event. The following players were named:

References

External links
Official IIHF website — 2010 OWG Women's Tournament Playing Format
Official IIHF website — Game Schedule
Vancouver 2010 Official website — Ice Hockey Schedule and Results 

 
Women
Olympics
2010
Olympics
Women's ice hockey competitions in Canada
Women's events at the 2010 Winter Olympics